Henry Husee was the Dean of Wells during 1302.

References

Deans of Wells